The 1981 Colorado Buffaloes football team represented the University of Colorado at Boulder in the Big Eight Conference during the 1981 NCAA Division I-A football season.  It was the third and final season for Chuck Fairbanks' as head coach, and the first year of blue jerseys for the Buffaloes, which were phased out in 1984.

The Buffaloes finished at 3–8 (2–5 in Big 8, seventh) for a third consecutive losing season. Home games were played on campus at  Folsom Field in Boulder. After a shutout loss at Kansas, CU defeated last-place Kansas State by three points at home in the season finale to avoid the conference cellar.

Fairbanks resigned in early June 1982 to become head coach, president, and minority owner of the New Jersey Generals of the new United States Football League (USFL). His overall record at CU was a disappointing ,  in conference. Bill McCartney, the defensive coordinator at Michigan under Bo Schembechler, was announced as Colorado's new head coach on June 9, and led the program for thirteen seasons, through 1994.

Schedule

Roster

References

External links
University of Colorado Athletics – 1981 football roster
Sports-Reference – 1981 Colorado Buffaloes

Colorado
Colorado Buffaloes football seasons
Colorado Buffaloes football